The Bengali–Assamese languages (also Gauda–Kamarupa languages) is a grouping of several languages. This group belongs to the Eastern zone of Indo-Aryan languages. The languages in this group according to Glottolog includes Assamese, Bengali, Bishnupriya, Chakma, Chittagonian, Hajong, Kharia Thar, Kurmukar, Lodhi (also categorised as a Munda language), Mal Paharia, Noakhailla, Rajbangshi, Rohingya, Sylheti, Tangchangya and Surjapuri.

Languages

Language comparison chart
* = borrowed terms (including tatsamas, ardhatatsamas and other borrowings)

* = borrowed terms (including tatsamas, ardhatatsamas and other borrowings)

Verbs

References

Bibliography

 
 

Eastern Indo-Aryan languages
Indo-Aryan languages